Virat or Viraat is an Indian male given name that may refer to the following people:

Viraat Badhwar (born 1995), Australian golfer 
Virat Kohli (born 1988), Indian cricketer 
Virat Singh (born 1997), Indian cricketer

See also
VIRAT
Viraat (disambiguation)
Virata (disambiguation)

Indian masculine given names